Hejde is a populated area, a socken (not to be confused with parish), on the Swedish island of Gotland. It comprises the same area as the administrative Hejde District, established on 1January 2016.

Geography 
Hejde is situated in central Gotland. The medieval Hejde Church is located in the socken. , Hejde Church belongs to Hejde parish in Klinte pastorat.

References

External links 

Objects from Hejde at the Digital Museum by Nordic Museum

Populated places in Gotland County